Guy Roger Toindouba (born April 14, 1988 in Garoua) is a Cameroonian football midfielder who plays . He also holds Gabonese citizenship.

Career 
He was from July 2007 to January 2008 loaned out to Cotonsport Garoua, from Sahel SC and signed then in Summer 2009 for Al Ahly Tripoli. In 2010 winter mercato, Roger signed for Espérance Sportive de Tunis. On 1 November 2011, it was announced that he would join Lillestrøm SK for the 2012 season.

International career
He played with Cameroon National Team against Colombia on 16 October 2012. As it was a friendly match, Toindouba is still eligible to play for Gabon.

References

External links 
NBC Olympics
Guy Toindouba at ZeroZero

1988 births
Living people
Cameroonian footballers
Expatriate footballers in Libya
Expatriate footballers in Tunisia
Expatriate footballers in Norway
Expatriate footballers in Turkey
Expatriate footballers in Kuwait
Expatriate footballers in Saudi Arabia
Cameroonian expatriate sportspeople in Libya
Cameroonian expatriate sportspeople in Tunisia
Cameroonian expatriate sportspeople in Turkey
Cameroonian expatriate sportspeople in Norway
Cameroonian expatriate sportspeople in Saudi Arabia
Association football midfielders
Sahel SC players
Coton Sport FC de Garoua players
Al-Ahli SC (Tripoli) players
Espérance Sportive de Tunis players
Lillestrøm SK players
Adana Demirspor footballers
JS Kairouan players
Al Jahra SC players
Al Salmiya SC players
Najran SC players
Tunisian Ligue Professionnelle 1 players
Eliteserien players
TFF First League players
Kuwait Premier League players
Saudi First Division League players
Cameroonian expatriate sportspeople in Kuwait
Libyan Premier League players